Rinaudo is a surname. Notable people with the surname include:

 Fabián Rinaudo (born 1987), Argentinian football player
 Leandro Rinaudo (born 1983), Italian football player
 Matthew Rinaudo (born 1995), American Twitch streamer

Italian-language surnames